The 1894 Crescent Athletic Club football team was an American football team that represented the Crescent Athletic Club in the American Football Union (AFU) during the 1894 college football season. The team played its home games at Eastern Park in Brooklyn and compiled a 2–7 record. Harry Beecher was the official coach of the team, assisted by Duncan Edwards, Wyllys Terry, William H. Ford, and William Bull.  George B. Pratt, formerly of Amherst College, was the team captain.

Schedule

References

Crescent Athletic Club
Crescent Athletic Club football seasons
Crescent Athletic Club football